Raymond Leo Enright (born June 15, 1929) was a Canadian football player who played for the BC Lions and Edmonton Eskimos. He played college football at the University of North Dakota.

In 1981, Enright was convicted of first-degree murder and sentenced to life in prison in the August 8, 1980 shooting death of Suzanne Meloche at a Calgary restaurant. Held at the William Head Institution, he was paroled in 2001.

References

1929 births
BC Lions players
Canadian football running backs
Canadian players of American football
Edmonton Elks players
Players of Canadian football from Alberta
Canadian football people from Edmonton
North Dakota Fighting Hawks football players
Canadian people convicted of murder
People convicted of murder by Canada
Living people